Lasca is a ghost town located in Hudspeth County, Texas, west of Sierra Blanca and east of El Paso. It is at an elevation of 4459 feet above sea level (1359 meters).

External links
 Topographical map: Lasca quadrangle
 description of locale

Ghost towns in West Texas
Geography of Hudspeth County, Texas